Afrasura ichorina is a moth of the subfamily Arctiinae first described by Arthur Gardiner Butler in 1877. It is found in Kenya and South Africa.

References

Moths described in 1877
ichorina
Moths of Africa